The Minnesota Young DFL (simply referred to as MYDFL)  is the official youth caucus of the Minnesota Democratic–Farmer–Labor Party (DFL). The group's membership is open to any Minnesotan Democrat under the age of 36. The Minnesota Young DFL is nationally affiliated with the Young Democrats of America. Its current president is Marco Hernandez.

History 
The Minnesota Young DFL was formed shortly after the merger of the Minnesota Farmer–Labor Party and the Minnesota Democratic Party. While still in its infancy, it provided an early endorsement for then-Minneapolis Mayor Hubert H. Humphrey's U.S. Senate run. As Walter F. Mondale recalls (then a student at Macalester College):

In early 1948, hoping to earn the party's nomination for the Senate in November, Humphrey made one last push to consolidate the organization behind him. One of his first moves came at the convention of the Young DFL in Minneapolis.... The room was divided right down the middle, the United Front supporters on one side and our group on the other, and you could have cut the tension with a knife. I was afraid we were going to be outnumbered if it came to an endorsement vote, so I brought a big crowd over from the St. Paul college campuses – Macalester College, Hamline, and St. Thomas. We packed that place, and I think we caught the other side by surprise. The hard-left people got up and gave their speeches about how we were fascists, then Humphrey got up and brought the crowd to its feet. At one point, someone in the audience asked if he thought the United Front supporters were actually members of the Community Party. he said, "Well, if they're not members, they are cheating it out of dues money."

Afterward, Mayor Humphrey received the endorsement and a month later at the state convention did the same. "He had the numbers and he won the crowd, and after that the party belonged to him."

Minnesota Young DFL leadership 
The membership of the Minnesota Young DFL elects its officers at an annual convention.  The most recent in-person convention was held on May 19, 2019, in Blaine.

Its executive committee consists of a president, an executive vice president, three vice presidents for Greater Minnesota, a vice president for the Twin Cities, outreach officer, secretary, treasurer, political director, programming and finance director, communications director, and two  national committee representatives not of the same gender identity. The Chair of the College Democrats of Minnesota and the Chair of the Minnesota High School Democrats also serve as ex-officio voting members of the MYDFL Executive Committee.

In addition to their duties within the Minnesota Young DFL, the President also serves on the DFL State Executive committee while the Executive Vice President serves on the DFL State Central Committee.

See also 
 Young Democrats of America
 College Democrats
 Young Democrats of America High School Caucus

References

External links 
 Minnesota Young DFL
Young Democrats of America
Minnesota Democratic–Farmer–Labor Party
Political organizations established in 1947